C.L. Barnhouse may refer to:

Charles Lloyd Barnhouse
C. L. Barnhouse Company